Bethnal Green was a parliamentary constituency in the Bethnal Green area of the East End of London, which returned one Member of Parliament (MP)  to the House of Commons of the Parliament of the United Kingdom from 1950 until it was abolished for the February 1974 general election.

It was then partly replaced by the new Bethnal Green and Bow constituency.

Boundaries

This area had been part of the County of London since 1889, having previously been part of the historic county of Middlesex.

The constituency, when created in 1950, comprised the whole of the Metropolitan Borough of Bethnal Green in the County of London. In 1955 part of the Metropolitan Borough of Hackney was added to the seat. The wards involved were Triangle, Victoria and Wick.

In 1965 Bethnal Green became part of the London Borough of Tower Hamlets in Greater London. Hackney was expanded to form the London Borough of Hackney.

Members of Parliament

Elections

Elections in the 1950s

Elections in the 1960s

Elections in the 1970s

References 

 Boundaries of Parliamentary Constituencies 1885-1972, compiled and edited by F.W.S. Craig (Parliamentary Reference Publications 1972)

Politics of the London Borough of Tower Hamlets
Parliamentary constituencies in London (historic)
Constituencies of the Parliament of the United Kingdom established in 1950
Constituencies of the Parliament of the United Kingdom disestablished in 1974
Bethnal Green